The 1972–73 New England Whalers season was the Whalers' first season (based in Boston). The Whalers were competitive from the start, placing first in the Eastern Division to qualify for the playoffs. They then won three playoff series to become the first winner of the Avco World Trophy.

Offseason

Regular season

Final standings

Schedule and results

Playoffs

Eastern Division Semifinal vs. Ottawa Nationals

Eastern Division Final vs. Cleveland Crusaders

Avco World Trophy Finals vs. Winnipeg Jets

Player statistics

Awards and records

Transactions

Draft picks

Farm teams

See also
1972–73 WHA season

References

External links

New
New
New England Whalers seasons
New England
New England